Alex Guenette (born April 25, 1996) is a Canadian professional stock car racing driver. The Quebec race car driver currently competes in the NASCAR Pinty's Series, driving the No. 39 for Dave Jacombs Racing. He has also competed in other series, most notably the NASCAR Camping World Truck Series and ARCA Racing Series.

Racing career

Early years
Guenette began his racing career at the age of seven, his father and grandfather being professional race car drivers. Before stock cars, Guenette raced go-karts, motocross and four-wheelers. He tested stock cars in 2011 at age fifteen, was rookie of the year in the 2012 Quebec Super Truck Series and finished second in the 2013 World Series of Asphalt. A longstanding tradition of Guenette's is to eat Tim Hortons on race mornings.

ARCA Racing Series
Guenette ran one ARCA race, at Talladega Superspeedway in 2014 for Mario Gosselin, a fellow Canadian. He finished 20th, two laps down.

NASCAR Pinty's Series
Guenette ran the entire Canadian Tire Series schedule in 2013. Running Dodges for Jacombs Racing, he posted two top fives and another three top tens in the No. 39, compared to two did not finishes. Of the top fives, the best finish was a second place at Autodrome St. Eustache. He received major funding from Motos Illimitees, DLGL, and Kawasaki.  Guenette was the series' most popular driver in 2013. In 2014, he ran four races in the 39, but with grandfather Jacques Guenette as the owner. He posted a best finish of second, which he accomplished twice, once at St. Eustache and once at Circuit ICAR.

NASCAR Camping World Truck Series
Guenette's first Truck start came for Gosselin, at Canadian Tire Motorsport Park, driving the No. 39 Chevrolet Silverado, running double duty with the NASCAR Pinty's Series race that weekend. He was running near the top ten until oil line issues hampered Guenette's effort, and he finished 25th. In 2014, both of his starts came at Martinsville Speedway. In the spring race, he start and parked for Gosselin, finishing last after running only 32 laps. For the fall, Guenette was picked to drive the No. 32 Chevrolet Silverado for Turner Motorsports. In final practice, he posted the fastest 10-lap average. He qualified twelfth and finished ninth after a flat tire dropped him from sixth.

NASCAR Xfinity Series
Guenette made his Xfinity debut on May 14, 2016 in the Ollie's Bargain Outlet 200. Driving the No. 97 for Obaika Racing, he finished fifteenth in his heat and twenty-seventh in the main race. Returning to the No. 97 at Pocono Raceway a few weeks later, Guenette posted his best career finish and only lead lap finish, a 24th. Running a third race for Obaika at Daytona International Speedway, an early wreck eliminated him from contention. For the series' next race at Kentucky Speedway, Guenette signed with fellow Canadian team King Autosport, finishing 26th. Guenette did not return to NASCAR competition in 2017.

Motorsports career results

NASCAR
(key) (Bold – Pole position awarded by qualifying time. Italics – Pole position earned by points standings or practice time. * – Most laps led.)

Xfinity Series

Camping World Truck Series

Pinty's Series

ARCA Racing Series
(key) (Bold – Pole position awarded by qualifying time. Italics – Pole position earned by points standings or practice time. * – Most laps led.)

 Season still in progress
 Ineligible for series points

References

External links
 

Living people
1996 births
People from Terrebonne, Quebec
Racing drivers from Quebec
ARCA Menards Series drivers
NASCAR drivers